Phoenix, originally The Phoenix, is one of two peer-reviewed journals of the Classical Association of Canada (the other is Mouseion), and the oldest classics journal published in Canada.

Phoenix publishes two double issues a year containing scholarly papers embodying original research in all areas of Classical Studies: the literature, language, history, philosophy, religion, mythology, science, archaeology, art, architecture, and culture of the Greek and Roman worlds from earliest times to about AD 600.

History
The Phoenix was founded in 1946 as the first journal of classics in Canada, by the country's first organisation for the study of classics, the Ontario Classical Association. When the nationwide Classical Association of Canada was founded in 1947, the Ontario Classical Association transferred to it responsibility for The Phoenix.

References

External links
Phoenix website

Classics journals
Publications established in 1946